Urogonodes astralaina is a moth in the family Drepanidae. It was described by Wilkinson in 1972. It is found in Nepal.

References

Moths described in 1972
Drepaninae